Neil Erasmus (born 2 December 2003) is an Australian rules football player who plays for Fremantle in the Australian Football League (AFL).

Erasmus was drafted with Fremantle's second selection, the 10th overall, in the 2021 national draft. He was named to make his AFL debut for Fremantle in the Western Derby in round 3 of the 2022 AFL season.

Statistics
 Statistics are correct to the end of round 10, 2022

|- style="background-color: #EAEAEA"
! scope="row" style="text-align:center" | 2022
|
| 28 || 5 || 1 || 2 || 28 || 26 || 54 || 13 || 11 || 0.2 || 0.4 || 5.6 || 5.2 || 10.8 || 2.6 || 2.2
|- class="sortbottom"
! colspan=3| Career
! 5
! 1
! 2
! 28
! 26
! 54
! 13
! 11
! 0.2
! 0.4
! 5.6
! 5.2
! 10.8
! 2.6
! 2.2
|}

Notes

References

External links

 

2003 births
Living people
Fremantle Football Club players
Australian rules footballers from Western Australia
People educated at Hale School
Peel Thunder Football Club players